This is a complete list of the operettas written by the Austrian composer Johann Strauss II (1825–1899). With the exceptions of Eine Nacht in Venedig and three incomplete works (Die lustigen Weiber von Wien, Romulus and Der Schelm von Bergen), all premieres took place in Vienna.

List of operettas

Operettas arranged by others using music by Johann Strauss II (selection)

 La reine Indigo, opérette in 3 acts (1875)
 La tzigane, opérette in 3 acts (1877)
 Wiener Blut, Operette in 3 acts, arranged by Adolf Müller (1899)
 Gräfin Pepi, Operette in 3 acts, arranged by E Reiterer (1902)
 Tausend und eine Nacht, Operette in a prelude and 2 acts, arranged by E Reiterer (1906)
 Reiche Mädchen, Operette in 3 acts (1909)
 Der blaue Held, Operette in 3 acts (1912)
 Faschingshochzeit, Operette arranged by J Klein (1921)
 Casanova, Operette in 7 scenes, arranged by Ralph Benatzky (1928)
 Walzer aus Wien, Singspiel in 2 acts, arranged by Julius Bittner and Erich Wolfgang Korngold (1930)
 , Operette in 3 acts, arranged by Bernard Grun and Oskar Stalla (1934)

References
Sources
Lamb, Andrew (1992), 'Strauss, Johann' in The New Grove Dictionary of Opera, ed. Stanley Sadie (London) 

Lists of operas by composer
 
Strauss, Johann 2